"Mon amie la rose" is a poem written by Cécile Caulier and Jacques Lacome, originally performed in song by French singer Françoise Hardy in 1964. It became one of Hardy's most popular songs, and was collected on her album Mon amie la rose.

Background
The song was written in response to the death of actress Sylvia Lopez from leukemia in 1959. It was first presented by  Cécile Caulier on the French variety series Le Petit Conservatoire de la chanson. Françoise Hardy then contacted Caulier and offered to record the song for her 1964 album.

Formats and track listings

French SP 
Disques Vogue (V.45-1252), 1964.
A-side: "Mon amie la rose" (lyrics: Cécile Caulier / music: Cécile Caulier and Jacques Lacome) – 2:17
B-side: "Je n’attends plus personne" ("Non aspetto nessuno"), (ad. lyrics from G. Meccia: F. Hardy / music: E. Ciacci) – 3:09

French EP 
Disques Vogue] (EPL. 8291), 1964.
A1: "Je veux qu'il revienne" ("Only You Can Do It"), (ad. lyrics from B. Well alias Charles Blackwell: F. Hardy / music: B. Well) – 2:41	
A2: "Mon amie la rose" (lyrics: Cécile Caulier / music: Cécile Caulier and Jacques Lacome) – 2:17	
B1: "La nuit est sur la ville" (F. Hardy) – 2:17	
B2: "Nous étions amies" ("eravamo amici"), (F. Hardy, ad. lyrics from Rossi: F. Hardy / music: C. Combo) – 2:35

English EP 
Mon amie la rose, Disques Vogue/Vogue International Industries (VRE 5017), 1966.
A1: "Je n’attends plus personne" ("Non aspetto nessuno"), (ad. lyrics from G. Meccia: F. Hardy / music: E. Ciacci) – 3:09
A2: "Pourtant tu m'aimes" (F. Hardy) – 2:21
B2: "Mon amie la rose" (lyrics: Cécile Caulier / music: Cécile Caulier and Jacques Lacome) – 2:17
B3: "Je veux qu'il revienne" ("Only You Can Do It"), (ad. lyrics from B. Well alias Charles Blackwell: F. Hardy / music: B. Well) – 2:41

Natacha Atlas cover

An electronic–world music version performed by British-Belgian singer Natacha Atlas was released in 1999.  The song was produced by Transglobal Underground for Atlas' third album Gedida (1999).

Formats and track listings
These are the formats and track listings of major single releases of "Mon Amie La Rose" by Natacha Atlas.

French CD single
 "Mon amie la rose" 
 "Mon amie la rose" (French Radio remix)

Belgian CD single
 "Mon amie la rose" 
 "Mon amie la rose" (French Radio remix)
 "Bastet"

Promotional CD single
 "Mon amie la rose" (Radio edit remix)
 "Mon amie la rose"

Charts

Jarvis Cocker cover
In 2021, Jarvis Cocker released a cover version on his album Chansons d'Ennui Tip-Top.

References

1964 singles
1999 singles
French-language songs
Françoise Hardy songs
Natacha Atlas songs
1964 songs
Disques Vogue singles